Captain Woodley Francis Losack (5 October 1769 – 30 May 1838) was an officer of the British Royal Navy, who served during the French Revolutionary Wars and the Napoleonic Wars.

Family background

He was the youngest of the eight children of Richard (James) Hawkshaw Losack and Christiana Losack (née  Maclure). Woodley Losack was born on 5th October, 1769 in Basseterre, Saint Kitts. His father Richard was appointed the Lieutenant Governor of the Leeward Islands.  His brother George Losack preceded him into the Royal Navy and rose to the rank of admiral.

Early naval career

Lieutenant Losack and Lieutenant Keith Maxwell were promoted to the rank of commander for their services in this enterprise.

In 1801,he was appointed captain and held the temporary command of  the 36-gun fifth rate  in the spring of 1801. On 1 May 1801, Jason captured la Dorade, a brig privateer of 14 guns and 51 men. Later that year, he was appointed Captain of HMS Helena (1804), an 18-gun sloop. On 5 June, 1805, the Helena captured the Santa Leocadia, a Spanish privateer of 14 guns and 114 men.

Post-captain

Losack was made post-captain on 22 January 1806. In 1807 he was appointed as Captain of  the second rate ship of the line .

The Battle of Tamatave

From 7 September 1810 to July 1814 he was Captain of  the fifth rate . On 20 May 1811 he took part in the Battle of Tamatave between a squadron, under the command of Captain Charles Marsh Schomberg, which comprised three English frigates (HMS Galatea,  and ), and the brig-sloop , and three French vessels of superior force (Renommée, Clorinde and Néréide).

The action marked the end of the final French attempt to operate in the Indian Ocean during the Napoleonic Wars. The surviving participants in the battle qualified for the Naval General Service Medal, which was awarded in 1847 with clasp "Off Tamatave 20 May 1811".

There were recriminations among the British squadron, Schomberg praising Astraea and Phoebe but omitting Racehorse and Galatea from the recommendations in his post-battle report. Captain Losack was particularly offended as Schomberg had implied that Galatea's distress signal that was flown during the battle was an overreaction in the face of the enemy, despite her casualties being greater than the rest of the squadron combined.

He subsequently requested a court martial to clear any suggestion of cowardice from his name but the Admiralty refused,  commenting that they were fully satisfied with his conduct. Historian William James claims that opinion within the Navy was also with Losack and that Schomberg had been excessively harsh in his criticism.

Notes

References
 

1769 births
1838 deaths
Royal Navy officers
Royal Navy personnel of the French Revolutionary Wars
Royal Navy personnel of the Napoleonic Wars